Dam Dam is a village in Zalaqi-ye Gharbi Rural District, Besharat District, Aligudarz County, Lorestan Province, Iran. At the 2006 census, its population was 36, in 8 families.

References 

Towns and villages in Aligudarz County